The men's 50 kilometres walk at the 2010 European Athletics Championships was held on the streets of Barcelona on 30 July.

Medalists

Records

Schedule

Results

Final

References
Results

Walk 50 km
Racewalking at the European Athletics Championships